Xubyarlı may refer to:
 Xubyarlı, Imishli, Azerbaijan
 Xubyarlı, Jabrayil, Azerbaijan